TriStar Pictures, Inc. (spelled as Tri-Star until 1991) is an American film studio and production company that is a member of the Sony Pictures Motion Picture Group, part of the  multinational conglomerate Sony. It is a corporate sibling of Sony studio Columbia Pictures.

TriStar Pictures was established on March 2, 1982, and founded by Victor Kaufman as Nova Pictures.

History

Early era (1982–1987)
The concept for Tri-Star Pictures can be traced to Victor Kaufman, a senior executive of Columbia Pictures (then a subsidiary of the Coca-Cola Company), who convinced Columbia, HBO, and CBS to share resources and split the ever-growing costs of making movies, leading to the creation of a new joint venture on March 2, 1982. On May 16, 1983, it was given the name Tri-Star Pictures (when the new company was formed and did not have an official name, the press used the code-name "Nova", but the name could not be obtained as it was being used as the title for the PBS science series). Tri-Star became the first new major Hollywood motion picture studio to be established since RKO Pictures was founded in 1928. Tri-Star embarked on a 12 to 18 feature film slate per year, with a combined budget of $70 to $80 million and signed producer Walter Colbenz as vice president of the Tri-Star feature film studio, and signed initial development deals with director John Schlesinger and producers Jeffrey Walker and Michael Walker. Tri-Star's first project to roll out was The Muppets Take Manhattan.

On May 11, 1984, the studio's first produced film was released, The Natural starring Robert Redford. Tri-Star's first release, however, was the film, Where the Boys Are '84; a 1984 remake of the 1960 Metro-Goldwyn-Mayer picture, Where the Boys Are that was co-distributed on behalf of ITC Entertainment after Universal rejected it; the film was a commercial flop.

Many of Tri-Star's productions were released on VHS by RCA/Columbia Pictures Home Video, HBO/Cannon Video, or CBS/Fox Video. In addition, HBO owned exclusive cable distribution rights to the films, with broadcast television licenses going to CBS.

On May 8, 1984, Tri-Star Pictures secured North American distribution rights for the film Supergirl from Warner Bros., which enabled the film to be ready for distribution by Christmas 1984. On May 15, 1984, the studio hit big through its association with Carolco Pictures, with the distribution of second part of the Rambo franchise, Rambo: First Blood Part II, which eventually became a smash hit for the studio the following year. The company once partnered with Producers Sales Organization to handle theatrical distribution of the PSO titles.

Early in the 1980s, Tri-Star Pictures and Columbia set up a film partnership with Delphi Film Associates and acquired an interest in various film releases. In 1984, Delphi Film Associates III acquired an interest in the Tri-Star and Columbia film slate for 1984, which included $60 million in financing for film production.

CBS dropped out of the Tri-Star venture in 1985, though they still distributed some of Tri-Star's films on home video until at least 1992. In 1986, HBO also dropped out of the venture and sold half of its shares to Columbia Pictures. That same year, 1986, Tri-Star entered into the television business as Tri-Star Television. Tri-Star television was formed when the studio joined forces with Stephen J. Cannell Productions and Witt/Thomas/Harris Productions and created a television distribution company called TeleVentures. Carolco would eventually expand its relations with Tri-Star Pictures and decide to distribute films such as Rambo III and Air America. Carolco was able to retain all foreign, cable, TV and videocassette rights. On August 20, 1986, Tri-Star Pictures and Taft/Barish Productions, a joint venture of Taft Broadcasting and Keith Barish Productions, signed a $200 million domestic distribution deal, where they would receive four to six pictures a year, with ten pictures total, with options to do more, with ancillary rights being handled for cable TV by HBO and on video by Vestron Video.

In 1987, they had proposed a home video label, Tri-Star Video, to release Tri-Star material, with Saul Melnick serving as president of the unit. Tri-Star had plans to convert into a major film studio, growing enough by the success of TV syndication and home video, in order to start a new umbrella distribution Tri-Star Telecommunications Group, to take over videocassette distribution of Tri-Star films from RCA/Columbia Pictures Home Video, beginning in 1988, and the plans for the first three Tri-Star films to go on home video was Sweetheart's Dance, Like Father, Like Son and Sunset, and Arnold Messner became president of the Tri-Star Telecommunications Group, handles up to 15 Tri-Star titles and 15-20 additional titles from the outside. The television side of Tri-Star Telecommunications Group is the syndication unit TeleVentures, and represents its interest in the joint venture, and locked up rights to 36 CBS television movies, as well as Sha Na Na, and distribution of Stephen J. Cannell product and handle syndication of Tri-Star's theatrical product which was effective to go production that year. Tri-Star Telecommunications Group has plans to assume worldwide distribution of its product instead of preselling them in the past. In 1987, Tri-Star International was set up with former head of Columbia Pictures International, S. Anthony Macke to be hired as executive vice president in charge of production for the newly created international division, the company already had worldwide rights to its product in order to need up its international apparatus.

Also, in July 1987, Tri-Star Pictures made a pact with CPI Film Holdings, a wholly-owned subsidiary of The Coca-Cola Company, whereas the latter had bought out 3.3 million shares at $15 per share for a total purchase price of $50 million, boosting its stake in Tri-Star to 29.3%, and Victor Kaufman said that the new capital would "enhance our ability to continue to expand our business activities", and decided to maintain our goal of achieving a dividend payout of 40%. In September 1987, Hemdale Film Corporation had signed an agreement with Tri-Star Pictures whereas Tri-Star would allow Hemdale to release fifteen major motion pictures over the next three years, and the company would receive a 17% free for donations that would be handled jointly by both Tri-Star and Hemdale, and more specialized productions could go to the company's distribution arm.

Columbia Pictures Entertainment era (1987–1989)
On December 21, 1987, Tri-Star Pictures, Inc. was renamed as Columbia Pictures Entertainment, Inc. when Coca-Cola sold its entertainment business to Tri-Star for $3.1 billion. Both studios continued to produce and distribute films under their separate names.

That year, once Coca-Cola sold its entertainment business, Tri-Star's television division was consolidated into a single operating entity with Columbia/Embassy Television to form a new incarnation of the Columbia Pictures Television. Merv Griffin Enterprises would continue to operate separately.

On April 13, 1988, CPE spun off Tri-Star Pictures, Inc. as a reformed company of the Tri-Star studio. Around that time, Tri-Star has shut down its video division, absorbing it into RCA/Columbia Pictures Home Video.

Sony era (1989–present)
In 1989, Columbia Pictures Entertainment, Inc. was acquired by Japanese conglomerate Sony Corporation, which re-merged Columbia and Tri-Star, but continued to use the separate labels. On July 11, 1990, Tri-Star Pictures dissolved and sold its venture in TeleVentures to Stephen J. Cannell Productions and TeleVentures became Cannell Distribution Co. Most of the series and the Tri-Star film packages that were distributed by TeleVentures were transferred to Columbia Pictures Television Distribution. Sony Pictures Entertainment later revived TriStar Television as a television production banner in 1991 and merged with its sister television studio Columbia Pictures Television to form Columbia TriStar Television on February 21, 1994. Both studios continued to operate separately under the CTT umbrella until TriStar folded in 1999 and CPT in 2001.

In addition to its own slate, TriStar was the theatrical distributor for many films produced by Carolco Pictures (the rights to only one of its films, Cliffhanger, has been retained by TriStar). TriStar also theatrically distributed some FilmDistrict movies. In 1992, the deal with Carolco lapsed when TriStar, along with Japan Satellite Broadcasting signed an agreement with The IndieProd Company to distribute movies produced by the pact in order to fill the void.

Around summer 1998, SPE merged Columbia and TriStar to form the Columbia TriStar Motion Picture Group, but just like Columbia Pictures Entertainment, both divisions continued producing and distributing films under their own names. Some of the movies slated to be released by TriStar, including Stepmom would go to its flagship label Columbia Pictures following the merger.

TriStar was relaunched on May 13, 2004, as a marketing and acquisitions unit that had a "particular emphasis on genre films". Screen Gems' executive vice president Valerie Van Galder was tapped to run the revived studio after being dormant. However, the release of its 2013 film Elysium represented the label's first big-budget release since The Mask of Zorro in 1998.

The same year, former 20th Century Fox co-chairman Tom Rothman joined Sony Pictures and created TriStar Productions as a joint venture with existing Sony Pictures executives. The new TriStar will develop, finance and produce up to four films per year, as well as television programming and acquisitions, starting on September 1. Sony's TriStar Pictures unit will be retained for "other product, including titles from Sony Pictures Worldwide Acquisitions", and will distribute product from the new TriStar.

Logo

TriStar's logo features a Pegasus (either stationary or flying across the screen). The idea came from executive Victor Kaufman and his family's interest in riding horses. The original logo was created with the assistance of Sydney Pollack, who was an adviser at Tri-Star. The horse in the original filmed logo was the same one used in Pollack's film The Electric Horseman.

Filmography

Film series

See also
 Affirm Films
 Columbia Pictures
 Screen Gems
 Sony Pictures Classics
 Triumph Films
 Destination Films

References

External links
 Official Sony Pictures website

American brands
Film production companies of the United States
Sony Pictures Entertainment Motion Picture Group
Mass media companies established in 1982
Mass media companies established in 2004
Joint ventures
Re-established companies
American independent film studios
Sony Pictures Entertainment
Sony subsidiaries
1982 establishments in California
Companies based in Culver City, California
HBO
Home Box Office, Inc.
Former CBS Corporation subsidiaries